Miss Venezuela 1985 was the 32nd Miss Venezuela pageant, was held in Caraballeda, Vargas state, Venezuela, on May 3, 1985, after weeks of events.  The winner of the pageant was Silvia Martínez, Miss Guárico.

The pageant was broadcast live on Venevision from the Macuto Sheraton Hotel in Caraballeda, Vargas state. At the conclusion of the final night of competition, outgoing titleholder Carmen María Montiel, crowned Silvia Martínez of Guárico as the new Miss Venezuela.

Results
Miss Venezuela 1985 - Silvia Martínez (Miss Guárico)
Miss World Venezuela 1985 - Ruddy Rodríguez (Miss Anzoátegui) 

The runners-up were:
1st runner-up - Nina Sicilia (Miss Monagas)
2nd runner-up - Gisela Paz (Miss Departamento Libertador)
3rd runner-up - Marina Di Vora (Miss Portuguesa)
4th runner-up - Yvonne Balliache (Miss Miranda)
5th runner-up - Fulvia Torre (Miss Lara)
6th runner-up - Rebeca Costoya (Miss Nueva Esparta)

Special awards
 Miss Photogenic (voted by press reporters) - Ruddy Rodríguez (Miss Anzoátegui)
 Miss Congeniality - Eugenia Lugo (Miss Táchira)
 Miss Elegance - Nina Sicilia (Miss Monagas)
 Miss Amity - Marlene Malavé (Miss Delta Amacuro)

Delegates
The Miss Venezuela 1985 delegates are:

 Miss Amazonas - Janeth Pérez Zambrano
 Miss Anzoátegui - Ruddy Rodríguez De Lucía
 Miss Apure - Ingrid Serrano González
 Miss Aragua - Mary Gracia Bravo Silva
 Miss Barinas - Maria Dolores García
 Miss Bolívar - Denisse Novell Nieto
 Miss Carabobo - Linda Guerrero Trabasillo
 Miss Cojedes - Rita de Gois Agostinho
 Miss Delta Amacuro - Marlene Narcisa Malavé
 Miss Departamento Libertador - Gisela Paz Besada
 Miss Departamento Vargas - Gisselle Reyes Castro
 Miss Distrito Federal - Raquel Frederick Pérez
  Miss Falcón - Zulma López Velásquez
 Miss Guárico - Silvia Martínez Stapulionis
 Miss Lara - Fulvia Torre Mattioli
 Miss Mérida - Olga Hernández Fernández
 Miss Miranda  - Yvonne Balliache Guevara
 Miss Monagas - Nina Sicilia Hernández
 Miss Nueva Esparta - Rebeca Costoya López
 Miss Portuguesa - Marina Di Vora Cedolini
 Miss Sucre - Beatrix Montero Hafemann
 Miss Táchira - Eugenia Lugo Behrens
 Miss Trujillo - Carmen Cecilia Candiales
 Miss Yaracuy - Raiza Preziuso Pernía
 Miss Zulia - Rosalina Méndez Semeco

External links
Miss Venezuela official website

1985 beauty pageants
1985 in Venezuela